Gilbert Keremond was the member of Parliament for Great Grimsby in 1413 and 1416. He was also mayor of the town.

References 

Year of birth missing
Year of death missing
Mayors of Grimsby
English MPs May 1413
Members of the Parliament of England for Great Grimsby
English MPs March 1416